Crooked Stick Golf Club is a golf club located in Carmel, Indiana, a suburb north of Indianapolis.  The 18-hole Pete and Alice Dye designed golf course was built in 1964. It has been noted as one of the top 100 courses in the United States by Golfweek and Golf Magazine, two of golf's most popular magazines.

Crooked Stick was host to the PGA Championship in 1991 won by John Daly and the U.S. Women’s Open in 1993, won by Lauri Merten. It also hosted the Solheim Cup matches in 2005. Crooked Stick also hosted the PGA Tour's BMW Championship in 2012 and 2016, when Dustin Johnson won with a record breaking -23.

Scorecard

Major tournaments hosted

References

External links
 
 Dye Designs Website

Golf clubs and courses in Indiana
Buildings and structures in Hamilton County, Indiana
Sports venues in Indianapolis
Golf clubs and courses designed by Pete Dye
Solheim Cup venues